The World Women's Wrestling Association (WWWA) World Tag Team Championship was the top doubles championship in All Japan Women's Pro-Wrestling (AJW) from 1970 until it closed in 2005. During those years the title was held by many of the most famous tag teams in Japanese women's professional wrestling, including the Beauty Pair (Jackie Sato and Maki Ueda) and the Crush Gals (Chigusa Nagayo and Lioness Asuka).  The WWWA Tag Team belt succeeded AJW's original tag belt, the American Girls Wrestling Association (AGWA) Tag Team Championship, which was contested in AJW from 1968 until 1970.

Title history

Combined reigns

By team

By wrestler

See also 

 List of professional wrestling promotions in Japan
 List of women's wrestling promotions
 Professional wrestling in Japan

References

Notes

External links 
 WWWA World Tag Team title history

All Japan Women's Pro-Wrestling Championships
Women's professional wrestling tag team championships